KPOD may refer to:

 KPOD (AM), a radio station (1240 AM) licensed to Crescent City, California, United States
 KPOD-FM, a radio station (97.9 FM) licensed to Crescent City, California, United States